Rajeev Ram and Bobby Reynolds were the defending champions. They chose to not play this year.
Eric Butorac and Scott Lipsky won in the final 6–1, 6–4, against Colin Fleming and Ken Skupski.

Seeds

Draw

Draw

References
 Doubles Draw
 Qualifying Draw

Tallahassee Tennis Challenger - Doubles
2009 Doubles